The Church of Saint Sophia is a church in Ohrid, North Macedonia. The church is one of the most important monuments of North Macedonia, housing architecture and art from the Middle Ages.

History

The current church was built on the foundations  of a metropolitan cathedral demolished in the first decade of the 6th century by the barbarian invasions that brought the early Slavs into the region. The next church was built during the First Bulgarian Empire, after the official conversion to Christianity. Some sources date the building of the church during the rule of Knyaz Boris I (852 – 889). It was basically rebuilt in the last decade of the 10th century as a patriarchal cathedral in the form of a dome basilica, after the replacement of the capital of Bulgaria in Ohrid, during the reign of Tsar Samuil, when the church was the seat of the Bulgarian Patriarchate, an autocephalous Patriarchate. Later it became a seat of the Archbishopric of Ohrid, under the Patriarchate of Constantinople until the 18th century.

It was converted into a mosque during the rule of the Ottoman Empire. The interior of the church has been preserved with frescoes from the 11th, 12th and 13th century, which represent some of the most significant achievements in Byzantine painting of the time. The main part of the church was built in the 11th century, while external additions were built by Archbishop Gregory II in the 14th century.

In November 2009, the Macedonian Orthodox Church adopted a new coat of arms with the church of St. Sophia as a charge on the shield.

A detail from the church is depicted on the reverse of the North Macedonian 1000 denars banknote, issued in 1996 and 2003.

Gallery

See also

Churches in Ohrid 
Church of St. John at Kaneo
Church of Saints Clement and Panteleimon

References

External links 

 Pictures of the Church

Macedonian culture
Ohrid
Medieval churches of Ohrid
Medieval Bulgarian Orthodox church buildings
Churches in North Macedonia
Sophia
Sophia
Archbishopric of Ohrid